MTV Music Generator 3: This Is the Remix, known in Europe as simply MTV Music Generator 3, is a music video game developed by Mix Max and published by Codemasters for PlayStation 2 and Xbox in 2004.

Reception

The game received "generally favorable reviews" on both platforms according to the review aggregation website Metacritic.

References

External links
 

2004 video games
Codemasters games
MTV video games
Music video games
PlayStation 2 games
Xbox games
Video games developed in the United Kingdom